The 1981 AIAW National Division III Basketball Championship was the second annual tournament hosted by the Association for Intercollegiate Athletics for Women to determine the national champion of collegiate basketball among its Division III members in the United States.

The tournament was held at the University of Wisconsin–La Crosse in La Crosse, Wisconsin.

Wisconsin–La Crosse defeated Mount Mercy in the championship game, 79–71, to capture the Roonies' first AIAW Division III national title.

Format
Sixteen teams participated in a single-elimination tournament, a decrease in eight teams from the previous year's championship.

The tournament also included a third-place game for the two teams that lost in the semifinal games.

Tournament bracket

See also
1981 AIAW National Division I Basketball Championship
1981 AIAW National Division II Basketball Championship
1981 NAIA women's basketball tournament

References

AIAW women's basketball tournament
AIAW Division II
AIAW National Division II Basketball Championship
1981 in sports in Wisconsin
Women's sports in Wisconsin